Onur Acar (born 1 January 1983) is a Turkish former professional footballer.

References

External links
 
 

1983 births
Living people
Footballers from Ankara
Turkish footballers
Turkey under-21 international footballers
MKE Ankaragücü footballers
Adanaspor footballers
Eyüpspor footballers
Balıkesirspor footballers
Süper Lig players
Yeni Malatyaspor footballers
Association football defenders